Xəzər or Khazar is a village and municipality in the Neftchala Rayon of Azerbaijan. It has a population of 1,273.

References

Populated places in Neftchala District